is a Japanese television drama series that aired from April 7, 2019, to June 28, 2020. It is the third installment of the Girls × Heroine Series produced by Takara Tomy and OLM, Inc. with the assistance of Shogakukan and EXPG Studio. The series stars Minami Hishida, Kira Yamaguchi, Toa Harada, and Ran Ishii. Additional cast members include Mandy Sekiguchi, Tsubasa Honda, and Takumi Saitoh, with narration provided by Toshiyuki Toyonaga. The plot is centered on Phantomirage, a group of middle school gentleman thieves who fight the Gyakugyaku Police and steal the treasures in people's hearts. This was also the last installment of the Girls × Heroine series to be produced in the Heisei period and the first to be produced in the Reiwa period.

The show launched a brief idol career for the main cast, who hold music activities as the Japanese idol girl group Mirage² and Girls² to promote the show. Following the show's end in 2020, it was succeeded by Police × Heroine Lovepatrina!

Plot 
Kokomi Sakurai is a cherry tomato-loving first-year middle schooler. One day, she encounters Kumachi, a bear-like fairy who was being chased by the Reverse Police who were searching for comrades of justice. Kokomi's father is turned into an Ikenaier by the Reverse Police, a group of bad cops who use the Reverse Jewels to turn "cool people" into "Ikenaiers", an evil polarised versions of themselves. Kokomi is chosen by the Phantomi Wristy to transform into Phantomirage. Becoming mass media sensations, the Phantomirage, are warned to conceal their identities from the public or something bad will happen.

Characters

Phantomirage 
Phantomirage is a group of phantom thieves recruited by Phandy to recover the Secret Keys. In order to do so, they steal Reverse Jewels from people's hearts to purify them into Secret Keys. Each girl owns Secret Keys and the Phantomi Ring, which they can use to transform using a brace-like . The Secret Keys allow them to use different spy and stealth capabilities with their Phantomi Wristy. After meeting Phangry, they are given the pocket watch/compass-shaped Phantomi Time and the Kizuna Key, that will allow the girls to power up into a mode called "Kizuna Style" and use the gun-like weapon Phantomi Final. They are given another item by Phandy called the Phantomi Coffret, where they have to collect the fragrance-like artifacts Phantomi Perfumes.

Played by: Minami Hishida
Kokomi is a bright and energetic girl who loves fun things and people's smiles. Her family owns a bakery and cafe called Sweets Cafe, which is very popular among both teenagers and young adults. She holds the Heart Ring to transforms into the pink-colored . Her catchphrase is "My heart is fluttering!"

Played by: Kira Yamaguchi
Saki is a cheerful and trendy girl who knows the latest news. She holds the Spade Ring to transforms into the blue-colored . Her catchphrase is "It's just getting started!"

Played by: Toa Harada
Yotsuba is gentle girl who has a high regard towards her family, she was raised with her little sister by their single mother. Yotsuba wished to be a Phantomirage so that she could protect those she loved. She holds the Clover Ring to transforms into the purple-colored . Her catchphrase is "I want to protect those precious to me!"

Played by: Ran Ishii
In the beginning, Seira was a mysterious girl who gives clues about her identity. She initially refused to work with the girls due to believing they were un-phantomi like, preferring to work on her own. She later agrees to join after realising that her father, a phantom thief, failed because he was alone. Her catchphrase is "You are, Phantomi-like!"

Allies and Civilians 

 A teddy bear-like fairy who sent by Phandy to search for the Phantomirage. Their silk hat is a portal that sends the Reverse Jewels, that the Phantomirage retrieve, to Phandy.

Played by: Mandy Sekiguchi
 Phantomirage's stern and immature mentor, he sent Kumachi to the human world to recruit the Phantomirage members in order collect the Reverse Jewels which he keeps in his safe. Normally communicating with the Phantomirage via holograms, he warns them not to reveal their true identities or something bad will happen.

 Played by: Shun Oguri
 Phandy's polite and sentient older brother who works with the Phantomirage as well as being a famous actor. He provides the Phantomi Time and the Kizuna Key, that will allow the girls to power up.

Played by: Takumi Saitoh
 Kokomi's father runs a family bakery and café where his daughter and her friends usually hang out. He later leaves for the Amazon to search for cacao.

 Played by: Takafumi Imai
Shinichi Sakurai's pupil who took charge of the shop while his boss went to the Amazon in search of cacao.

 Played by: Seiko Iwaidou
 Yotsuba and Nanoha's mother who works at a flower shop.

 Played by: Miyu Sasaki
 Yotsuba's little sister who triggers Yotsuba to want to become a Phantomirage.

 Played by: Ryōka Minamide
 Fumiaki is Kokomi and Saki's classmate who is a member of the school's newspaper club. Intrigued by the Phantomirage, he writes many articles regarding the girls.

 Played by: Miyu Yagyū
 Kokomi's health teacher and their dance club mentor, who changes to "Julia" when wearing a blonde wig that triggers her love of dance. She is also Phandy's pupil, sent to assist the girls.

Played by: Rina Yamaguchi
Sarai was an abandoned doll that SakaSama turned into a cheerful 5th grade student with the ability to enhance Reverse Jewels into Ultimate Reverse Jewels. While given the task of exposing Phantomirage's civilian identities, she kept the information to herself while occasionally forcing the Reverse Police to play with her. The revelation from learning her true origins causes Sarai to power herself up into Dark Sarai before being purified by Phantomirage, permanently turning her human as a result. She becomes friends with Phantomirage, even gaining her own Phantomi Coffret and Phantomi Perfume. The producer confirmed Sarai will be return in Police × Heroine Lovepatrina! as a main character.

Played by: Dream Ami
Phantomirage's mischievous senior with overly exaggerated expressions. Her alter ego is "Phantomi Queen". Her theme color is gold.

Reverse Police 
 are an illegal police group from the Reverse World who "Reverse Arrest" a nice and cool person, using the Reverse Jewels to polarize their hearts and turn them into an evil, uncool .

Played by: Dandy Sakano
The heartless ruler of the Reverse World who seeks to turn everyone "uncool", resembling a reversed "Akiramestone". When the Phantomirage members interfere in his plans, he uses the energy that Reverse Police gathered to create Sarai and use her to deal with Phantomirage before she ultimately sided with the girls.

Played by: Nicole Ishida
The Chief of the Reverse Police, who usually makes her subordinates to do all the work.

Played by: Kōdai Kuroishi
The Clique of the Reverse Police in a kindergarten uniform who is normally partnered with Abekobe, preferring forceful arrests than thinking things through.

Played by: Pee
The brains of the Reverse Police, though it is a mystery if they're actually smart or not.

Played by: Miyuki Ōshima
A summer-only leader of the group, who resembles shaved ice.

Production 
In 2018, LDH held a casting call for child talents through an audition titled LDH Presents The Girls Audition, with results later broadcast on an episode of TBS's Gekidan Exile, which aired on November 6, 2018. Minami Hishida, Kira Yamaguchi, and Toa Harada were announced as winners in the actress category. Phantomirage was trademarked in December 2018.

The full cast and details about the show were unveiled during its first press conference on February 26, 2019, where Hishida, Yamaguchi, and Harada were announced as the main cast. Prior to debuting as an actress, Yamaguchi had been part of EXPG Studio's female U-14 trainee group, Kizzy. The supporting cast consisted of Mandy Sekiguchi, Takumi Saitoh, Nicole Ishida, Kodai Kuroishi, and Pee, in addition to Tsubasa Honda providing the voice to Kumachi and Toshiyuki Toyonaga providing the narration. Ran Ishii was announced as a new cast member on June 13, 2019.

Kodai Asaka, Keiko Inoue from the comedy duo Nitche, Takeshi Nadagi, Masumi Yagi from the comedy duo Savanna, Koyuki Takahashi from the comedy duo Nihon Electric Rengo, Yui-P, and Ryo Kato were announced as upcoming guest characters. Yuki Miyoshi, Momoka Sumitani, Misaki Tsuruya, Youka Ogawa, and Kurea Masuda reprised their roles from Magical × Heroine Magimajo Pures! in episode 7, while Yuzuha Oda reprised her role from Idol × Warrior Miracle Tunes! in episode 11. Shun Oguri guest-starred as Phandy's older brother, Phangry, in episodes 25 to 27.

Episode 17, which aired on July 28, 2019, was a crossover episode arc with episode 68 of Kiratto Pri Chan. Phantomirage features the Miracle Kirats and Anju wearing their outfits, while Kiratto Pri Chan features a crossover episode with the Phantomirage members appearing in animated format.

During the show's run, Hishida, Yamaguchi, and Harada performed as their characters at events and released music under the name Mirage2 (stylized as mirage2 and pronounced "mirage mirage"). Their first single, "Jan Ken Pon", served as the show's first ending theme song and was first performed at a baton touch event with Magical × Heroine Magimajo Pures!. Ran Ishii later joined the group, debuting in their second single, "Doki Doki" which served as the show's second ending.

On November 17, 2019, the series was renewed for a second broadcast year, as well as a movie.

Media

Episode list

Secret × Heroine Phantomirage! is broadcast weekly from April 7, 2019, on TV Tokyo at 9:00 AM. Episodes were also uploaded onto Takara Tomy's YouTube channel one week after its original broadcast date, with each new episode available to Japanese residents only for up to one week.

Soundtrack

Throughout the series' run, the main cast released music as their characters under the group name Mirage² (pronounced "Mirage Mirage"). Following the reveal of Ran Ishii's character, Seira, she was added to the group on June 13, 2020. The group officially ended activities in June 2020, however, they made an appearance at Momoiro Uta Gassen on December 31, 2020, as part of the white team.

Albums

Extended plays

Singles

Film

On November 17, 2019, a theatrical film titled Gekijōban: Secret × Heroine Phantomirage!: Eiga ni Natte Chōdaishimasu was announced. The film's theme song is "ABCDEF Girl" by Girls² and the remaining five members of the girl group made a cameo appearance. Kizuna Perfume was distributed as a theater gift. The movie was originally scheduled to be released on May 1, 2020, but due to the COVID-19 pandemic it was postponed to July 23, 2020.

Other media appearances

The May 2019 issue of Pucchigumi, which was released on April 4, 2019, came with a Collab Pri Ticket for Kiratto Pri Chan arcade game machines containing Kokomi's Phantomirage uniform to use for the playable characters. As part of their summer collaboration with Kiratto Pri Chan, Seira's Phantomirage uniform was available for the arcade game beginning July 11, 2019 as their third collaboration jewel coordinate event. The September 2019 issue of Pucchigumi, released on August 1, 2019, also came with a Collab Pri Ticket featuring Seira's Phantomirage uniform for Kiratto Pri Chan arcade game machines.

References

External links
 
 Official Mirage2 website

2019 Japanese television series debuts
2020 Japanese television series endings
Girls × Heroine! television series
Japanese children's television series
Japanese drama television series
Magical girl television series
OLM, Inc.
Tokusatsu television series
TV Tokyo original programming